This is a list of the 6 members of the European Parliament for Luxembourg in the 1989 to 1994 session.

List

Party representation

Notes

Luxembourg 1989-1994
List
1989